Kevin Rueda (born March 16, 1969) is a retired American soccer goalkeeper who played professionally in the USISL and USL A-League.

Youth
Rueda attended the Santa Clara University, playing on the men's soccer team from 1987 to 1991.  In 1991, the Broncos fell to the Virginia Cavaliers in the NCAA Men's Division I Soccer Championship.

Professional
During 1992–1993, Rueda played for Carcassonne in the Championnat de France amateur 2. In 1996, he signed with the California Jaguars of the USISL. That season, Rueda and his teammates won the championship.  In July 1997, the New England Revolution called up Rueda as a standby goalkeeper.  That year, Rueda was the USISL Western Conference All Star goalkeeper. On February 1, 1998, the San Jose Clash selected Rueda in the second round (fifteenth overall) of the 1998 MLS Supplemental Draft. On April 2, 1998, the Clash waived him during the pre-season.  Rueda returned to the Jaguars but moved to the San Francisco Bay Seals in June. In July 1998, the Seals loaned Rueda to the Los Angeles Galaxy.  In February 1999, the Seals traded Rueda to the San Diego Flash for the Flash's second round draft pick.  He played seventeen games in 1999, but was relegated to backup in 2000. In June 2000, the Flash traded Rueda to the Rochester Rhinos in exchange for the Rhinos’ 2001 draft picks.  Rueda played one game.   In 2001, he played for the Atlanta Silverbacks.

References

External links
 

Living people
American soccer players
Atlanta Silverbacks players
California Jaguars players
LA Galaxy players
New England Revolution players
Rochester New York FC players
San Diego Flash players
San Francisco Seals (soccer) players
Santa Clara Broncos men's soccer players
USISL players
A-League (1995–2004) players
1969 births
San Jose Earthquakes draft picks
Association football goalkeepers
Soccer players from California
Expatriate footballers in France
American expatriate sportspeople in France
American expatriate soccer players
Championnat National 3 players